Ashot Ghulyan (6 October 1959 – 24 August 1992), also known as Bekor (Shard), was an Armenian military leader during the First Nagorno-Karabakh War. He was awarded the Hero of Artsakh honorary title.

Biography
Being a worker from Stepanakert, he dedicated himself to the movement for self-determination of Nagorno-Karabakh since the late 1980s. He was an underground activist and partisan leader of self-defense movement. In 1991 Bekor was wounded in Hadrut region, then participated during the captures of Khojaly and Shushi.

Bekor fought in a number of battles in Askeran, Hadrut, Shahumyan, Karkijahan, Verin Shen, Dashalty, Lachin and several others.

He was first to enter Shushi in 1992 after its capture. His friend, Armen Danielyan, said that as a commander Bekor was very attentive to the needs of all the men. A school in the Republic of Artsakh is named after him.

Awards
Military Cross
Liberation of Shushi medal

References

External links
Biography at Hayazg

1959 births
1992 deaths
Military personnel from Baku
Armenian military personnel of the Nagorno-Karabakh War
Heroes of Artsakh